Eucalyptus armillata, commonly known as red-flowered mallee or flanged mallee, is a mallee that is endemic to the south-west of Western Australia. It has smooth bark, narrow lance-shaped adult leaves, flower buds hanging downwards in groups of three, usually red flowers and prominently ribbed fruit with a double flange around the rim.

Description
The bark is pale grey to white turning pink to reddish purple and smooth over the length of the tree. The leaves on young plants and on coppice regrowth are dull green and narrow lance-shaped.

Taxonomy and naming
Eucalyptus armillata was first formally described in 2012 by Dean Nicolle and Malcolm E. French from a specimen collected south of Wongan Hills. The description was published in the journal Nuytsia. The specific epithet (armillata) is a Latin word meaning "ornamented with a bracelet", referring to the prominent flange at the top of the floral cup and around the rim of the fruit.

Distribution and habitat
The red-flowered mallee grows in mallee vegetation, usually on level ground from near Corrow and Calingiri to near Beacon and Wubin in the Avon Wheatbelt, Geraldton Sandplains, Jarrah Forest and Mallee biogeographic regions.

Conservation
Eucalyptus armillata is classified as "not threatened" by the Western Australian Government Department of Parks and Wildlife.

See also
List of Eucalyptus species

References

armillata
Endemic flora of Western Australia
Myrtales of Australia
Eucalypts of Western Australia
Plants described in 2012